Public Schools Act (with its variations) is a stock short title used in Manitoba, New South Wales and the United Kingdom for legislation relating to public schools.

List

Manitoba
The Public Schools Act, CCSM c P250

New South Wales
Public Schools Act of 1866

United Kingdom
 The Public Schools Act 1873

The Public Schools Acts 1868 to 1873 is the collective title of the following Acts:
The Public Schools Act 1868 (31 & 32 Vict c 118)
The Public Schools Act 1869 (32 & 33 Vict c 58)
The Public Schools Act 1871 (34 & 35 Vict c 60)
The Public Schools (Shrewsbury and Harrow Schools Property) Act 1873 (36 & 37 Vict c 41)
The Public Schools (Eton College Property) Act 1873 (36 & 37 Vict c 62)

See also
List of short titles

References

Lists of legislation by short title